The 1949 New South Wales Rugby Football League premiership was the forty-second season of Sydney's top-level professional rugby league football club competition, Australia's first. Ten teams from across the city contested the premiership during the season which culminated in a grand final between St. George and South Sydney.

Season summary
St. George winger Ron Roberts’ 25 tries during 1949 stands in third place behind Les Brennan's 29 in 1954 and Bob Lulham’s 28 in 1947 for the highest number of tries by a player in a debut season.

The 1949 season was also the last in the NSWRFL for future Australian Rugby League Hall of Fame inductee, Vic Hey.

Teams 
 Balmain, formed on 23 January 1908 at Balmain Town Hall
 Canterbury-Bankstown
 Eastern Suburbs, formed on 24 January 1908 at Paddington Town Hall
 Manly-Warringah
 Newtown, formed on 14 January 1908
 North Sydney, formed on 7 February 1908
 Parramatta, formed in November 1946
 South Sydney, formed on 17 January 1908 at Redfern Town Hall
 St. George, formed on 8 November 1920 at Kogarah School of Arts
 Western Suburbs, formed on 4 February 1908

Ladder

Finals 
Minor premier South Sydney's loss to St. George in the finals meant that a grand final would be necessary.

Grand Final

In a brutal encounter, St George ran in five tries and overcame minor premiers South Sydney 19–12 to claim their second premiership in front of 56,532 people, the second biggest crowd of all time to witness a Sydney club match.

Souths opened the scoring, with a converted try to Graves after 21 minutes. However the Dragons were led masterfully by their captain, Kangaroos five-eighth, Norman "Johnny" Hawke. Controlling all aspects of the match, Hawke took the game away from Souths who only got back into the contest when he was forced from the field with injury. Also injured was Saints forward George Jardine who played the match with a broken wrist.

St. George led 11–5 at half time. Hawke returned to the field after treatment and was later dubbed "Man of the Match" and "the Player’s Player".  The Dragons' wingers, season's top try scorer Ron Roberts (25 tries) and newcomer Noel Pidding scored two tries each.

Each of the grand final winning players received a record bonus of £300 each.

St. George 19 
Tries: Roberts (2), Pidding (2), McCoy
Goals: McCoy, Pidding

South Sydney 12
Tries: Graves, Purcell
Goals: Graves (3)

Player statistics
The following statistics are as of the conclusion of Round 18.

Top 5 point scorers

Top 5 try scorers

Top 5 goal scorers

References

External links
 Rugby League Tables – Notes AFL Tables
 Rugby League Tables – Season 1949 AFL Tables
 Premiership History and Statistics RL1908
 Finals lineups and results Hunterlink site
 Results:1941–1950 at rabbitohs.com.au
 1949 Labor Daily Cup at rleague.com
 NSWRFL season 1949 at rugbyleagueproject.org

New South Wales Rugby League premiership
NSWRFL season